Aryeh Leib ben Asher Ginzburg (or Wallerstein)  ( 1695 – June 23, 1785), also known as the Shaagas Aryeh,  was a Lithuanian rabbi and author.

Life
Born in Lithuania, c. 1695, he was a Rabbinical casuist. At one time Ginsburg was rabbi in Pinsk, and then later founded  a yeshivah in Minsk. Here however he engaged in hostile dispute with the Gaon Yechiel Halpern, whose supporters eventually drove Ginsburg from the city. Legend has it that the Shaagas Aryeh was run out of the city of Minsk on an oxen cart. Due to the insult, as he left the city he remarked "What, Minsk isn't burning yet?" For years, fires that broke out were attributed by the Jews of Minsk to the curse of the Shaagas Aryeh.

His most famous book Shaagas Aryeh (Hebrew, שאגת אריה,  for 'Roar of the Lion'), a collection of responsa, was first published in Frankfurt am Main in 1755 and is still frequently quoted in rabbinical debate, as are many of his responsa. After its publication he became known as  "the Shaagas Aryeh" after his book.

He became rabbi in Metz in France in 1765, but an early argument with his congregation led to him refusing to enter the synagogue except to give four sermons a year. Despite this he retained his post until he died in Metz on June 23, 1785.

Hasidim considered the Shaagas Aryeh "the definitive talmid hakham (great leader) of the generation", They maintain a legend that the Besht sought out the Shaagas Aryeh and "served him by putting his shoes on for him".

A legend exists of his death. During his studies a bookcase fell on him, covering him with books. His students were able to rescue him after an hour or so and he related to them that he had been covered by the books of the authors with whom he had quarreled.  He had asked forgiveness from all of them and they all complied save for one, Mordecai Yoffe (known as the Levush) who refused. He knew therefore that he was not long for this world, and pronounced the verse in Hebrew "Aryeh shoag mi loi yiroh"; i.e. that Aryeh (the lion, meaning himself)  (roars), but mi (an acronym of Mordecai Yoffeh, but can also mean 'who')  (is not afraid).

It is speculated that this legend is the source of the urban myth surrounding the death of the French-Jewish composer Charles-Valentin Alkan, whose family originated from Metz.

Works
Shaagas Aryeh - halachic discussions in the form of questions and answers, mostly on the topics of Orach Chaim
Gevuras Ari - glosses to Ta'anit, Yoma, Makkot (published Vilna, 1862)
Turei Even - glosses to the Talmudic tractates Rosh haShanah, Hagigah, and Megillah (published 1781)

Notes

Sources
 "Research into the Life and Family of the Shagas Aryeh" (Hebrew)
 Shagas Aryeh Research Project - With a focus on Genealogy
 Feuerwerker, David (1976), L’Émancipation des Juifs en France. De l’Ancien Régime à la fin du Second Empire. Albin Michel: Paris,  
 Finkelman, Shimon (1986), Shaagas Aryeh. Illustrated by Yosef Dershowitz. Brooklyn: Mesorah Publications. 1986. , .
 Gelbein. Moshe (2004). Jewish parables: a mashal for every occasion. ArtScroll series. ArtScroll (Mesorah). Brooklyn: Mesorah Publications. . See p. 158.
 Himelstein, Shmuel (2003) Wisdom & wit: a sparkling treasury of Jewish anecdotes and advice.Brooklyn: Mesorah Publications. , . See p. 295.
 Horowitz, Rabbi Levi Yitzchok (foreword) (2002), A Chassidic journey: the Polish Chassidic dynasties of Lublin, Lelov, Nikolsburg and Boston. Feldheim Publishers. 2002.  1583305688, . See p. 227.
 Kolel 'Iyun ha-daf (Jerusalem). Insight to the daf. Jerusalem; Tashen. 2007. . See p. 18.
 Yerushalmi, Shmuel. The Life and teachings of Rav Aryeh Leib ben Asher Gunzburg (1695-1785) [The Shaagas Aryeh]. In Hebrew. Vagshal.

1695 births
1785 deaths
18th-century Polish–Lithuanian rabbis
Lithuanian Orthodox rabbis
Rabbis from Minsk
Rabbis from Metz